Jean Asselborn (born 27 April 1949) is a Luxembourgish politician who has served in the government of Luxembourg as  Minister for Foreign Affairs since 2004. He also served as Deputy Prime Minister from 2004 to 2013, under Prime Minister Jean-Claude Juncker.

Early life and career
Jean Asselborn was born on 27 April 1949 in Steinfort.

Asselborn left school in 1967 at the age of 18, and began working in a Uniroyal plant that same year. It was during this time that he became actively involved in the trade union movement and was elected youth representative of the Federation of Luxembourg Workers (Lëtzebuerger Aarbechterverband), the precursor to the current OGBL trade union.

In 1968, Asselborn began working for the Luxembourg City administration as a civil servant, before returning to Steinfort in 1969, where he was also employed as a civil servant for the local administration.

Asselborn resumed his secondary studies in 1976, obtaining a diplôme de fin d’études secondaires from the Athénée de Luxembourg that same year. Upon obtaining his final secondary school diploma, he became the administrator of the Intercommunal Hospital of Steinfort (Hôpital intercommunal de Steinfort) in 1976, a post he held until 2004. In October 1981, he was awarded a master's degree in private judicial law from Nancy 2 University.

Asselborn became Mayor of Steinfort in 1982 and served in that position until 2004.

In government

Following the legislative elections of 13 June 2004, Jean Asselborn joined the government as Deputy Prime Minister, Minister of Foreign Affairs and Immigration on 31 July 2004.

Upon the return of the coalition government formed by the Christian Social Party (CSV) and the Luxembourg Socialist Workers' Party (LSAP) as a result of the legislative elections of 7 June 2009, Jean Asselborn retained the offices of Deputy Prime Minister, Minister of Foreign Affairs on 23 July 2009. In October 2012, at his instigation, Luxembourg was for the first time elected to a non-permanent seat on the United Nations Security Council for 2013 and 2014.

Following the legislative elections of 20 October 2013, Asselborn was appointed Minister of Foreign and European Affairs, Minister of Immigration and Asylum on 4 December 2013 in the coalition government formed by the Democratic Party (DP), the LSAP and the Green Party (“déi gréng”).

As of July 2004, Asselborn represents the Luxembourg government at the Council of Ministers of the European Union in its Foreign Affairs and General Affairs configurations. Jean Asselborn is currently the longest-serving minister among the Ministers of Foreign Affairs of the European Union.

Political views
In September 2010 Jean Asselborn declined a request of the Alternative Democratic Reform Party (ADR) to make Luxembourgish an official language of the European Union citing financial reasons and also that German and French being already official languages would be sufficient for the needs of Luxembourg. 

In early September 2016, Asselborn called for Hungary to be suspended or expelled from the European Union over its "massive violation" of EU fundamental values, citing concerns over its treatment of refugees during the European refugee crisis, independence of the judiciary and freedom of the press.

In March 2018, Asselborn condemned the Turkish invasion of northern Syria aimed at ousting US-backed Syrian Kurds from the enclave of Afrin. Asselborn said about Turkey's conduct that "this has nothing to do with self-defence any more", adding that Turkey would have to cease and desist from attacking the YPG and explain its conduct in Afrin to the NATO council.

Asselborn doubted that the peace agreement between Israel and the United Arab Emirates would bring stability to the region, stating there will be no stability without a two-state solution, and said the UAE had let the Palestinians down with the agreement.

Honorary distinctions
In December 2010, Jean Asselborn was awarded the Grand Cross of the Order of Merit (Großkreuz des Verdienstordens) of the Federal Republic of Germany.

In October 2013, he was appointed Commander of the National Order of the Legion of Honour (Ordre national de la Légion d’honneur) of the French Republic.

See also

 Juncker-Asselborn Ministry I (2004–2009)
 Juncker-Asselborn Ministry II (2009–2013 )
 Bettel-Schneider Ministry (2013–) 
List of foreign ministers in 2017
List of current foreign ministers

References

External links

|-

|-

|-

|-

1949 births
Alumni of the Athénée de Luxembourg
Deputy Prime Ministers of Luxembourg
Grand Crosses 1st class of the Order of Merit of the Federal Republic of Germany
Living people
Luxembourg Socialist Workers' Party politicians
Members of the Chamber of Deputies (Luxembourg)
Members of the Chamber of Deputies (Luxembourg) from Sud
Ministers for Foreign Affairs of Luxembourg
People from Steinfort
Presidents of the Chamber of Deputies (Luxembourg)
Recipients of the Order of the Sun of Peru